Olivier Ichoua (born 3 October 1970) is a retired French football midfielder.

References

1970 births
Living people
French footballers
FC Metz players
La Roche VF players
FC Martigues players
FC Sochaux-Montbéliard players
Association football midfielders
Ligue 1 players
Ligue 2 players